The Global Health Observatory (GHO) is a public health observatory established by the World Health Organization (WHO) to share data on global health, including statistics by country and information about specific diseases and health measures. The GHO tracks important information like "Response to the Millennium Development Goals".

History
The GHO was formed in around 2010 from the ashes of the WHO Statistical Information System, which was "upgraded... to provide you with more data, more tools, more analysis and more reports."

In December 2012, the WHO announced that it was making improvements in its GHO to improve its accessibility and usability by "specialists such as statisticians, epidemiologists, economists and public health researchers as well as anyone with an interest in global health."

Themes

The GHO website is organized around themes. For each theme, key statistics are presented on the associated webpage, and more detailed data and reports are available for download. The themes include:

 Millennium Development Goals
 Estimates of mortality and global health
 Health systems
 Public health and environment
 Health Equity Monitor
 International Health Regulations Monitoring framework
 Urban health
 Women and health
 Noncommunicable diseases
 Substance use and mental health
 Infectious diseases
 Injuries and violence

Reception and impact

The GHO has been listed by many libraries and dataset listings as a go-to source for information on health statistics. The GHO has also been cited in work of the Centers for Disease Control and Prevention in the United States.

GHO data has also been cited in academic studies on various aspects of global health, particularly for cross-country comparisons.

See also

 The World Bank data sets
 Gapminder, which compiles data on a number of indicators, including health indicators, from a variety of sources
 Human Mortality Database, which includes information on mortality and causes of mortality, but is restricted to data built from official records

References

External links

World Health Organization
Scientific databases
Health informatics